Mixite is a rare copper bismuth arsenate mineral with formula: BiCu6(AsO4)3(OH)6·3(H2O). It crystallizes in the hexagonal crystal system typically occurring as radiating acicular prisms and massive encrustations. The color varies from white to various shades of green and blue. It has a Mohs hardness of 3.5 to 4 and a specific gravity of 3.8. It has an uneven fracture and a brilliant to adamantine luster.

It occurs as a secondary mineral in the oxidized zones of copper deposits. Associated minerals include: bismutite, smaltite, native bismuth, atelestite, erythrite, malachite and barite.

It was discovered in 1879 near J´achymov, Czech Republic by mine engineer Anton Mixa. Mixite has also been found in Argentina, Australia, Austria, France, Germany, Greece, Hungary, Italy, Japan, Mexico, Namibia, Poland, Spain, Switzerland, the United Kingdom, and the United States.

Mixite is the namesake member of the mixite mineral group, which has the general chemical formula Cu2+6A(TO4)3(OH)6·3H2O, where A is a REE, Al, Ca, Pb, or Bi, and T is P or As. In addition to mixite, this mineral group contains the isostructural minerals agardite-(Y), agardite-(Ce), agardite-(Nd), agardite-(La), calciopetersite, goudeyite, petersite-(Ce), petersite-(Y), plumboagardite, and zálesíite.

References

RRUFF Project

Further reading
Downes, P. J., Hope, M., Bevan, A. W. R. and Henry, D. A. (2006): Chalcocite and associated secondary minerals from the Telfer gold mine, Western Australia. Austral. J. Mineral. 12, 25-42.
U., Blaß, G. & Auer, C. (2010): 1618) Bleihaltiger Agardit-(La) und Brookit von der Äußeren Wimitz, St. Veit an der Glan, Gurktaler
Alpen. P. 203 in Niedermayr et al. (2010): Neue Mineralfunde aus Österreich LIX. Carinthia II, 200./120., 199-260.
Petr Pauliš (2000): Nejzajímavější mineralogická naleziště Čech.
Palache, C., Berman, H., & Frondel, C. (1951), The System of Mineralogy of James Dwight Dana and Edward Salisbury Dana, Yale University 1837-1892, Volume II: 944; Neues Jahrbuch für Mineralogie, Monatshefte (1991), 487.
Lapis 2002(7/8), 54.
Sejkora, J., Gabasova, A., Novotna, M. (1997): Mixite from Smrkovec near Marianské Lazné. Bulletin Mineralogicko-Petrologického Oddělení Národního Muzea (Praha), 4-5, 185-187.
Sejkora, J.: Minerály ložiska Moldava v Krušných horách. Bulletin Mineralogicko-petrografického oddělení Národního muzea v Praze, 1994, volume. 2, s. 110-116.
Lapis 23(4), 18-34 (1998).
Jiří Sejkora, Petr Pauliš, Radana Malíková, Miroslav Zeman & Václav Krtek (2013): Supergenní minerály As ze štoly č. 2 Preisselberg, rudní revír Krupka (Česká republika) [Supergene As minerals from the Gallery No. 2, Preisselberg, the Krupka ore district (Czech Republic)]. Bulletin Mineralogicko-Petrologického Oddělení Národního Muzea (Praha) 21, 201-209.
Kuttna, Kutná Hora; Sejkora, J., Ondruš, P., Fikar, M., Veselovský, F., Mach, Z., Gabašová, A., Skoda, R. & Beran, P. (2006): Supergene minerals at the Huber stock and Schnöd stock deposits, Krásno ore District, the Slavkovský les area, Czech Republic. Journal of the Czech Geological Society 51, 57-101.
J.-L. Hohl: "Minéraux et Mines du Massif Vosgien", Editions du Rhin (Mulhouse), 1994.
R.PIERROT, L. CHAURIS, C. LAFORET (1973) : "Inventaire minéralogique de la France : 29- Finistère.", B.R.G.M. Paris.
Le Cahier des Micromonteurs, Bulletin de l'Association Française de Microminéralogie, 1985, N° 3, pp. 3–6.
Le Règne Minéral 1997, 13, p. 5-18.
Dubru. M, (1986) Pétrologie et géochimie du marbre à brucite et des borates associés au gisement de tungstène de Costabonne, (Pyrénées orientales, France) 930p.
J.C. Escande, Z. Johan, J. Lougnon, P. Picot, F. Pillard : "Note sur la présence de minéraux de bismuth dans un filon de barytine et fluorine à Faymont, près Le Val-d'Ajol (Vosges)", Bull. Soc. Fr. Minéral. Cristallogr., 1973, 96, 398-399.
Georges Favreau - Favreau G., Eytier J-R., Eytier C. (2010), Les minéraux de la mine de Falgayrolles (Aveyron), Le Cahier des Micromonteurs, n°109
Inventaire Minéralogique de la France N°7, p127-128.
[UKJMM 2:11-15 "Cap Garonne Secondary Copper and Lead - W.R. van den Berg"]
K. Walenta: "Die Mineralien des Schwarzwaldes", Weise (Munich), 1992.
Palache, C., Berman, H., & Frondel, C. (1951), The System of Mineralogy of James Dwight Dana and Edward Salisbury Dana, Yale University 1837-1892, Volume II: 944.
Wittern, A. (1995) Mineralien finden im Schwarzwald.
Wittern: "Mineralfundorte in Deutschland", 2001.
Schrenk, D. (2000): Die Minerale des Steinbruchs 'Blessing' bei Hornberg. Erzgräber, 14 (1), 10-17.
Lapis, 18 (2), 13-24.
S. Weiss: "Mineralfundstellen, Deutschland West", Weise (Munich), 1990.
Belendorff, K & Petitjean, K. (1987): Reichenbach im Odenwald. Die Mineralien von Fundpunkt 16.1. bei Reichenbach. LAPIS 12 (10), 23-32 + 58.
J. Gröbner und U. Kolitsch (2006): Neufunde aus dem Erzgebirge (II). Mineralien-Welt 17 (3), 22-27.
Frenzel, A. (1874): Mineralogisches Lexicon für das Königreich Sachsen.
Gröbner, J. and Kolitsch, U. (2007): The minerals of the uranium prospect at Tirpersdorf, Vogtland. Lapis 32, 37-42; 58.
Matthies, A. (2009): Mechelgrün im Sächsischen Vogtland: Uranmineralien als Haldenfunde. Lapis 34 (3), 41-43.
T. Witzke et al.: Lapis 2001(12), 13-27.
Jansa, J., Novák, F., Pauliš, P., Scharmová, M.: Supergenní minerály Sn-W ložiska Cínovec v Krušných horách (Česká republika). Bulletin mineralogicko-petrografického oddělení Národního muzea v Praze, 1998, roč. 6, s. 83-101.
Sejkora, J., Škoda, R., Škácha, P., Bureš, B. & Dvořák, Z. (2009): Nové mineralogické nálezy na Sn-W ložisku Cínovec v Krušných horách (Česká republika). Bulletin mineralogicko-petrologického oddělení Národního muzea v Praze 17 (2), 23-30.
Solomos, C., Voudouris, P. & Katerinopoulos, A. (2004): Mineralogical studies of bismuth-gold-antimony mineralization at the area of Kamariza, Lavrion. Bulletin of the Geological Society of Greece 34, Proceedings of the 10th International Congress, Thessaloniki, Greece, 387-396.
Heymann, J. (1982): Al-Adamin. LAPIS 7 (3), 26-28.
Lapis, 24, 7/8 (1999).
Boscardin M., Gaetani E., Mattioli V. (1994)-Olivenite ed altre novità di Punta Corna, Valle di Viù, Piemonte-Rivista Mineralogica Italiana, Milano-Fasc. 2, pp 113–121.
Ciriotti, M.E., Blaß, G. (2010): Pot-pourri 2009: Identificazioni UKiS AMI, Minerali italiani di interesse. Micro, 1/2010, 124-127.
Vecchi, F., Rocchetti, I. & Gentile, P. (2013): Die Mineralien des Granits von Predazzo, Provinz Trient, Italien. Mineralien-Welt, 24(6), 98-117.
Orlandi, P. & Criscuolo, A. (2009). Minerali del marmo delle Alpi Apuane. Pacini editore, Pisa, 180 pp.
Panczner(1987).

Arsenate minerals
Bismuth minerals
Copper(II) minerals
Hexagonal minerals
Minerals in space group 176